In enzymology, a L-aminoadipate-semialdehyde dehydrogenase is an enzyme that catalyzes the chemical reaction

L-2-aminoadipate 6-semialdehyde + NAD(P)+ + H2O  L-2-aminoadipate + NAD(P)H + H+

The 4 substrates of this enzyme are L-2-aminoadipate 6-semialdehyde, NAD+, NADP+, and H2O, whereas its 4 products are L-2-aminoadipate, NADH, NADPH, and H+.

This enzyme participates in lysine biosynthesis and biodegradation.

Nomenclature 

This enzyme belongs to the family of oxidoreductases, specifically those acting on the aldehyde or oxo group of donor with NAD+ or NADP+ as acceptor.  The systematic name of this enzyme class is L-2-aminoadipate-6-semialdehyde:NAD(P)+ 6-oxidoreductase. Other names in common use include:
 aminoadipate semialdehyde dehydrogenase,
 2-aminoadipate semialdehyde dehydrogenase,
 alpha-aminoadipate-semialdehyde dehydrogenase,
 alpha-aminoadipate reductase,
 2-aminoadipic semialdehyde dehydrogenase,
 L-alpha-aminoadipate delta-semialdehyde oxidoreductase,
 L-alpha-aminoadipate delta-semialdehyde:NAD+ oxidoreductase,
 L-alpha-aminoadipate delta-semialdehyde:nicotinamide adenine,
 and dinucleotide oxidoreductase.

References

 

EC 1.2.1
NADPH-dependent enzymes
NADH-dependent enzymes
Enzymes of known structure